Korea Primary Volleyball Federation(hangul : 한국초등배구연맹) is a subordinate organization of the Korea Volleyball Association. It was founded in 1971. 
It was established for enhancement of volleyball game in Korean elementary schools and the exchange of information among volleyball leaders.

Korean famous female volleyball player Kim Yeon-koung participated in a competition organized by the federation when she was in elementary school.
In particular, Lee Byung Seol, the current president of the Federation, was in charge of volleyball at Ansanseo Elementary School at the time and raised Kim Yeon-koung as a volleyball player. Through him, Kim Su-ji and Bae Yoo-na also grew into volleyball players.

Activities
 Hold the national championships and train the leader
 Find and assist volleyball hopefuls
 Provide scholarships to outstanding players

Events
 JEI National Elementary School Volleyball Championship (joint hosting : JEI Corporation) 

 Chugyebae National Elementary School Volleyball Championship(joint hosting : Jungang Girl's High School)
 KOVO Chongjaebae National Elementary School Volleyball Championship(joint hosting : Korea Volleyball Association)

See also
 Korea Volleyball Federation
 Korea Volleyball Association

References

External links
  

Volleyball in South Korea
1971 establishments in South Korea